Pomagagnon is a mountain of the Dolomites in Belluno, northern Italy. The mountain is part of the "Natural Park of the Ampezzo Dolomites".

References

Mountains of the Alps
Dolomites
Mountains of Veneto
Geography of Cortina d'Ampezzo